Power League Wrestling (PLW) is a professional wrestling promotion based in Pawtucket, Rhode Island. Former employees in PLW consist of professional wrestlers, managers, play-by-play and color commentators, announcers, interviewers and referees.

List of PLW alumni

Male wrestlers

Female wrestlers

Special guests

Stables and tag teams

Managers and valets

Commentators and interviewers

Referees

Other personal

See also
List of professional wrestlers

References

General

Specific

External links

Power League Wrestling alumni